Supreme Team was a South Korean hip hop duo made up of Simon Dominic and E-Sens. They officially debuted in 2009 with their EP Supreme Team Guide To Excellent Adventure. Following their debut, they received a Mnet Asian Music Award (MAMA) for Best New Male Group. In April 2012, E-Sens was sentenced two years of probation for smoking marijuana. E-Sens returned to the music scene in October 2012 through the release of the song "독" (Poison) from hip hop producer Primary's album, Primary and the Messengers LP. Most recently, Supreme Team revealed and performed two new songs at the 2013 Amoebahood concert. This was their first time performing new music together in two years. In July 2013, news outlets reported Supreme Team's disbandment due to E-Sens' contract termination with Amoeba Culture. E-Sens confirmed the news himself in a tweet, adding his intent to focus on his solo career. Simon D later joined as co-CEO of AOMG with Jay Park.

Discography

Studio albums

Extended plays

Singles

Awards
 Mnet Asian Music Awards – Best New Male Group (2009) 
 Mnet 20's Choice Awards – 20 Most Influential Stars (2010) 
 Golden Disk Awards – Hip hop Award (2010)

Notes

References

External links 
 

South Korean hip hop groups
Musical groups established in 2009
2009 establishments in South Korea
2013 disestablishments in South Korea
Musical groups disestablished in 2013
MAMA Award winners
Hip hop duos
Melon Music Award winners